Ward Committeepeople and Township Committeepeople are political party officials who serve many standard committeemen duties on behalf of their political party in Cook County, Illinois.

Structure and election
The city of Chicago, the largest municipality in Cook County, elects committeepeople (known as "committeemen" until 2018) from each of its 50 wards. Each of the 30 suburban civil townships in Cook County also elect committeepeople from each township. Each party that participates (the Democratic Party, the Republican Party, and possibly others) elects its own committeeperson.

Elections for Chicago ward committeepeople coincide with the primaries for presidential candidates, while elections for township committeepeople coincide with primaries for gubernatorial candidates.

Roles 
The positions are unpaid, with responsibilities that include voter registration, community forums, election materials, and election operations. In Chicago, the committeepeople are responsible for producing smooth political processes during the elections in their wards, which includes attempting to produce high voter turnout.

Committeepeople are voting members in the political organization of their party in the County. This role gives them authority on behalf of the party to select replacements for some vacated political posts such as United States Representative and state legislators. Replacements for some other vacancies are selected through other processes: vacated United States Senate posts are appointed by the Illinois Governor and vacated Chicago City Council posts are appointed by the Mayor of Chicago.

Operationally in Chicago, the committeeperson plays an important role in ward politics. The post of alderman and committeeperson are often closely linked: sometimes the former controls the latter and sometimes the same person holds both posts. In many cases, the committeeman also has influence over the doling out of jobs, favors, and services around the ward. Sometimes a committeeperson accumulates sufficient influence to place their loyalists into political positions outside of the ward.

Incumbents

Cook County Democratic Party Committeepeople
As of June 2020:

Cook County Republican Party Committeepeople
As of May 2021:

Notes

External links
 Cook County Directory of Elected Officials
 Green Party Ward and Precinct Committeepersons

Government of Cook County, Illinois